Paracataclysta is a monotypic moth genus in the family Crambidae described by Yutaka Yoshiyasu in 1983. Its single species, Paracataclysta fuscalis, was described by George Hampson in 1893. It is found in South-east Asia (including Sri Lanka and Borneo), northern Australia and Africa.

The wingspan is 10–14 mm. The forewings of the males are whitish, with a fuscous base in the costal half. The hindwings are whitish with scattered fuscous scales in the postmedian area. Females have dark fuscous forewings, irrorated (sprinkled) with whitish and with an orange-brown antemedian fascia and an orange-brown discal spot. The hindwings are whitish with a dark fuscous antemedian fascia.

Former species
Paracataclysta dualalis (Gaede, 1916)

References

 , 1999: Catalogue of the Oriental Acentropinae (Lepidoptera: Crambidae). Tijdschrift voor Entomologie 142 (1): 125–142.
 , 1983: A study of Thailand Nymphulinae (Lepidoptera: Pyralidae). (1) Description of Paracataclysta n. gen. Akitu N.S. 50: 1–6.

External links

Acentropinae
Moths described in 1893
Monotypic moth genera
Moths of Asia
Moths of Australia
Moths of Africa
Crambidae genera